The Tarbox Ramblers are a Boston-based roots and Americana band. The band's sound originally centered on arrangements of early twentieth-century blues, gospel and Appalachian music. It later included bandleader Michael Tarbox's original songs. The group's albums on the Rounder label include a self-titled debut and a second release, A Fix Back East. The albums feature three-part vocal harmonies, a heavy rhythm section and the interplay of slide guitar and violin. 

The original line-up with Robbie Phillips (washtub bass), J. Place (harmonica), Mickey Bones (drums, washboard and bones) and Michael Tarbox was formed in Cambridge, Massachusetts, in 1994.

The mid period group consisted of Tarbox (vocalist and guitarist), Daniel Kellar (violinist), Johnny Sciascia (upright bass fiddle), and Jon Cohan (drummer and percussionist). Since 2003 Nashville based musician, Scott McEwen plays (upright bass fiddle and percussion) with the Ramblers.  Rob Hulsman (drums, Nine Pound Hammer) joined in 2003 and toured and recorded with the band through 2005.

Rounder Records released The Tarbox Ramblers' eponymous debut album in 2000. In summer 2001, Robert Plant contacted the group, to secure them as his opening act for his Boston appearance, and subsequently asked them to continue touring with him. They made the BBC's list of top CDs in 2002. 

Tristram Lozaw, a reviewer from the Boston Herald, described the group as follows:

"If the Rolling Stones had happened 10 years earlier, hailed from Memphis and been produced by Ike Turner, they might have sounded like The Tarbox Ramblers. The way the Ramblers lay down their backroads grit and raw hillbilly-rock jive, you're unlikely to hear a more genuine blast of sandpaper rhythm and roots."

Discography
Tarbox Ramblers, Rounder Records, 2000 
A Fix Back East, Rounder Records, 2004 
Four From The West (limited edition live set) 2006
First Songs/Gospel Cross (limited edition early recordings) 2010
Songs For Robert Reuter (Live EP, recorded in December 2021) 2022

References

External links
 Biography and reviews
 Band site
 Recording Studio

American rock music groups
American blues musical groups
American folk musical groups